Harry Porterfield (born August 29, 1928) is a former news anchor for WBBM-TV.

Career
Porterfield was born in Saginaw, Michigan and began his career in 1955, working as a disc jockey for WKNX. Porterfield began working at WBBM in 1964 as a news writer. Porterfield left WBBM in 1985 for WLS-TV, where he worked for 24 years, but returned to WBBM in 2009 as the 11 a.m. news anchor. In December 2015, Porterfield announced his retirement.

While working for both WBBM and WLS, Porterfield was known for his "Someone You Should Know" segments.

Awards
Porterfield has won eleven Emmy Awards, a Studs Terkel Award, and the Alfred I. duPont–Columbia University Award. Porterfield also received the Legacy of Leadership Award at the Indiana University Neal-Marshall Eleventh Annual Alumni Graduation Reception.

CBS Boycott
In the late 1980s, Porterfield was demoted  from his job as anchorman at CBS to reporter when Bill Kurtis was made anchorman. As a result, Porterfield resigned from WBBM (CBS) and moved to WLS (ABC). This resulted in a 10-month boycott of CBS led by Jesse Jackson and Operation PUSH.

References

People from Saginaw, Michigan
1928 births
Living people
Eastern Michigan University alumni
DePaul University alumni